The Vélo d'Or français (French for "French Golden Bicycle") is a cycle racing award, created in 1992 by the French cycling magazine Vélo Magazine. The award is given annually to the French rider considered to have performed the best over the year. It is given to the winner at the same as the "Vélo d'Or" is given to the international rider.

Recipients

References

Cycle racing
Cycling awards
Cycle racing in France